Walter Horn is a former West German slalom canoeist who competed from the mid-1970s to the early 1980s. He won four medals in the C-1 team event at the ICF Canoe Slalom World Championships with two silvers (1977, 1979) and two bronzes (1973, 1975).

References

German male canoeists
Living people
Year of birth missing (living people)
Medalists at the ICF Canoe Slalom World Championships